Andrew Allen (c. 1987 – 9 February 2012) was an Irish murder victim.

A native of Derry, Allen was one of over thirty natives of Derry who had been forced from their homes by the Irish republican vigilante group calling itself Republican Action Against Drugs, or RAAD (as of 26 July 2012, the Irish Republican Army).

However while RAAD claimed responsibility for the murder, friends and family believe that another dissident organisation was involved and that the modus operandi and murder weapon was more likely linked to the Real IRA, which later joined forces with RAAD. The Real IRA has been the subject of claims that MI5 involvement in a previous murder was covered up.

RAAD claimed that Allen was a drug dealer (a charge denied by his family) and a threat from an unnamed group forced him to leave Derry. Allen moved to Lisfannon, Buncrana, County Donegal, where he lived with his partner and her two children. He was shot dead on 9 February 2012 by three gunmen. RAAD admitted responsibility for his death on 22 February, claiming they would kill a number of other individuals they claimed were drug dealers.

Derry-based priest Fr Michael Canny claimed a group called Republican Action Against Drugs was responsible for the attack on Allen. "At some stage last year between the Waterside and Cityside areas as many as 36 or 37 people have been exiled from their community and families." He added that Allen was the first of the Derry exiles to be killed.

References

External links
 Man Arrested in County Donegal Over Allen Murder @ Rte.ie
 Kieran Doherty Family Demand to See Unredacted Carlile Report @ Derryjournal

Deaths by firearm in the Republic of Ireland
Deaths by person in the Republic of Ireland
Irish murder victims
People from Derry (city)
People from County Donegal
People murdered in the Republic of Ireland
Terrorism deaths in the Republic of Ireland
2012 murders in the Republic of Ireland